Roberto Cañedo Ramírez (30 March 1919 – 16 June 1999), better known as Roberto Cañedo, was a Mexican actor of the Golden Age of Mexican cinema. During his career, he appeared in over 300 films.

Cañedo received two Ariel Award for Best Actor nominations for his performances in Pueblerina (1949) and Crime and Punishment (1951), he won for the former. In 1997, he was given a Golden Ariel for his life dedicated to the cinema.

Selected filmography
 The Coward (1939)
 In the Times of Don Porfirio (1940)
 The Unknown Policeman (1941)
 The Rock of Souls (1942)
 The Eternal Secret (1942)
 La razón de la culpa (1942)
 El Ametralladora (1943)
 My Memories of Mexico (1944)
 Gran Hotel (1944)
 Saint Francis of Assisi (1944)
 The Headless Woman (1944)
 The Hour of Truth (1945)
 A Day with the Devil (1945)
 Adultery (1945)
 Murder in the Studios (1946)
 Symphony of Life (1946)
 Fly Away, Young Man! (1947)
 Gangster's Kingdom (1948)
 The Unloved Woman (1949)
 Salón México (1949)
 La casa chica (1950)
 Crime and Punishment (1951)
 Los dineros del diablo (1953)
 Hotel Room (1953)
 The White Rose (1954)
 Lola the Truck Driver (1983)
 La Coyota (1987)
 Grave Robbers (1989)

References

External links

1919 births
1999 deaths
20th-century Mexican male actors
Best Actor Ariel Award winners
Mexican male film actors
Mexican male television actors
People from Guadalajara, Jalisco
Male actors from Guadalajara, Jalisco